Motherland Democratic Coalition (Ekh Oron-Ardchilal) was a coalition of political parties in Mongolia for the 2004 legislative elections.
Member parties were:
 Democratic Party
 Motherland Party
 Civic Will Party

They received 474,977 votes (44.27%) and 35 seats in the State Great Khural.

References

Political party alliances in Mongolia